Captain Paul Hobson (died 1666) was an antinomian Particular Baptist who served in the parliamentary army during the English Civil War.

He was one of the signatories to the Baptist Confession of 1644, who later adopted Fifth Monarchy ideas, and later arrested for his part in the Farnley Wood Plot.

References

External links
Short Biographical & Hobson's Book Fourteen Queries 1655

Year of birth missing
1666 deaths
English Baptists
17th-century Baptists
Roundheads